Karlskär is a village (smaller locality) on the Lake Mälaren island of Färingsö, Ekerö Municipality, Stockholm County, Sweden.

References

Populated places in Ekerö Municipality
Uppland